Margaritaria nobilis, also known as bastard hogberry, is a fruit-bearing plant found in Mexico, Central America, South America, and the West Indies.

The fruit is a bright iridescent blue color, resulting from a complex surface structure which interferes with light waves.

References

External links 
http://www.ecouterre.com/inspired-by-bastard-hogberry-fruit-new-fiber-changes-color-when-stretched/  "uses" for Margaritaria Nobilis
https://web.archive.org/web/20130409183448/https://www.seas.harvard.edu/news-events/press-releases/bioinspired-fibers-change-color-when-stretched/
http://onlinelibrary.wiley.com/doi/10.1002/adma.201203529/abstract
http://www.ecouterre.com/inspired-by-bastard-hogberry-fruit-new-fiber-changes-color-when-stretched/   Pepto Berry, used in chemical research on fibers used in fabric manufacturing for the garment industry

Flora of Central America
Phyllanthaceae
Plants described in 1782
Trees of Peru
Trees of South America
Taxa named by Carl Linnaeus the Younger